Ålesund Church is a parish church of the Church of Norway in Ålesund Municipality in Møre og Romsdal county, Norway. It is located in the center of the town of Ålesund, on the island of Aspøya. It is one of two churches for the Ålesund parish which is part of the Nordre Sunnmøre prosti (deanery) in the Diocese of Møre. The large, stone church was built in a long church design and in the Art Nouveau style in 1909 using plans drawn up by the architect Sverre Knudsen. The church seats about 800 people.

History
Historically, the area of Ålesund was part of the Borgund Church parish. In 1848, Ålesund was established as a kjøpstad and soon after it was granted permission to build a church. The first church in Ålesund was constructed in 1853-1854 and it was consecrated on 25 January 1855. The new church became its own parish in 1858. The new church was designed by the architect Heinrich Ernst Schirmer. The church's design was very similar to the Strøm Church in Sør-Odal municipality in Hedmark county. It was built out of brick and it had a cruciform design. The exterior brick was left unpainted, but the western tower was covered in white plaster. On 23 January 1904, the church was destroyed by the great Ålesund fire. Hundreds of buildings were destroyed and nearly the entire town had to be rebuilt. Afterwards, a competition of architects was held to design the new, replacement church building. Sverre Knudsen was chosen as the person to design the new Ålesund Church.

The new church was to be located on the same site as the previous church, although its orientation was reversed (entrance on the east end and the choir on the west end). The foundation stone for the new church was laid down on 13 July 1906 by the new King Haakon VII. The church is a three aisled long church constructed out of stone. Roughly  of marble cover the church's façade. The church took about three years to be completed and it was consecrated on 15 September 1909. The tower is asymmetrically located on the south side of the building.

Media gallery

See also
List of churches in Møre

References

External links
Maria & Ronny Got Married, "The Surprise" - Ålesund Church - Norway (HD) extensively shows the interior of Ålesund Church, including the choir loft.

Buildings and structures in Ålesund
Churches in Møre og Romsdal
Long churches in Norway
Stone churches in Norway
Art Nouveau church buildings in Norway
20th-century Church of Norway church buildings
Churches completed in 1909
1855 establishments in Norway